The 1897 Oklahoma Sooners football team represented the University of Oklahoma as an independent during the 1897 college football season. In their third year of football and first year under head coach Vernon Louis Parrington, the Sooners compiled a 2–0 record, and outscored their opponents by a combined total of 33 to 8.

Schedule

Roster

References

Oklahoma
Oklahoma Sooners football seasons
College football undefeated seasons
Oklahoma Sooners football